The 1892 United States presidential election in New Hampshire took place on November 8, 1892, as part of the 1892 United States presidential election. Voters chose four representatives, or electors to the Electoral College, who voted for president and vice president.

New Hampshire voted for the Republican nominee, incumbent President Benjamin Harrison, over the Democratic nominee, former President Grover Cleveland, who was running for a second, non-consecutive term. Harrison won New Hampshire by a narrow margin of exactly 4%. This would be typical of the 1876 to 1892 period, but the state would turn much more Republican in subsequent elections: Cleveland's victories in Carroll and Coös Counties would be the last time a Democrat won any county in the state until 1912.

With 51.11% of the popular vote, New Hampshire would prove to be Harrison's fifth strongest victory in terms of percentage in the popular vote after neighboring Vermont, Maine, Massachusetts and Pennsylvania.

This would prove one of only two times in its history that a President was elected to a second full term without carrying New Hampshire either time (the other being James Madison in 1812 after also losing the state in 1808). George Washington, James Monroe, Abraham Lincoln, Ulysses Grant, William McKinley, Woodrow Wilson, Dwight Eisenhower, Richard Nixon, Ronald Reagan, Bill Clinton, and Barack Obama all carried the state twice. Franklin Roosevelt carried New Hampshire in three of his four runs. Two-termers Thomas Jefferson, Andrew Jackson, and George W. Bush all carried the state in one of their two successful runs.

Results

Results by county

See also
 United States presidential elections in New Hampshire

References

New Hampshire
1892
1892 New Hampshire elections